Events in the year 1902 in Germany.

Incumbents

National level
 Kaiser – Wilhelm II
 Chancellor – Bernhard von Bülow

State level

Kingdoms
 King of Bavaria – Otto of Bavaria
 King of Prussia – Kaiser Wilhelm II
 King of Saxony – Albert of Saxony to 19 June, then George of Saxony
 King of Württemberg – William II of Württemberg

Grand duchies
 Grand Duke of Baden – Frederick I
 Grand Duke of Hesse – Ernest Louis
 Grand Duke of Mecklenburg-Schwerin – Frederick Francis IV
 Grand Duke of Mecklenburg-Strelitz – Frederick William
 Grand Duke of Oldenburg – Frederick Augustus II
 Grand Duke of Saxe-Weimar-Eisenach – William Ernest

Principalities
 Schaumburg-Lippe – George, Prince of Schaumburg-Lippe
 Schwarzburg-Rudolstadt – Günther Victor, Prince of Schwarzburg-Rudolstadt
 Schwarzburg-Sondershausen – Karl Günther, Prince of Schwarzburg-Sondershausen
 Principality of Lippe – Alexander, Prince of Lippe (with Ernest II, Count of Lippe-Biesterfeld as regent)
 Reuss Elder Line – Heinrich XXII, Prince Reuss of Greiz to 19 April, then Heinrich XXIV, Prince Reuss of Greiz (with Heinrich XIV, Prince Reuss Younger Line as regent)
 Reuss Younger Line – Heinrich XIV, Prince Reuss Younger Line
 Waldeck and Pyrmont – Friedrich, Prince of Waldeck and Pyrmont

Duchies
 Duke of Anhalt – Frederick I, Duke of Anhalt
 Duke of Brunswick – Prince Albert of Prussia (regent)
 Duke of Saxe-Altenburg – Ernst I, Duke of Saxe-Altenburg
 Duke of Saxe-Coburg and Gotha – Charles Edward, Duke of Saxe-Coburg and Gotha
 Duke of Saxe-Meiningen – Georg II, Duke of Saxe-Meiningen

Colonial governors
 Cameroon (Kamerun) – Jesko von Puttkamer (7th term) to 3 February, then … Plehn (acting governor) to 2 October, then again Jesko von Puttkamer (8th term)
 Kiaochow (Kiautschou) – Oskar von Truppel
 German East Africa (Deutsch-Ostafrika) – Gustav Adolf von Götzen
 German New Guinea (Deutsch-Neuguinea) – Albert Hahl (acting governor to 10 November) (2nd term)
 German Samoa (Deutsch-Samoa) – Wilhelm Solf
 German South-West Africa (Deutsch-Südwestafrika) – Theodor Leutwein
 Togoland – August Köhler to 20 January, then vacant to 1 December, then Waldemar Horn

Events
 December–February 1903 – Venezuelan crisis, in which Britain, Germany and Italy sustain a naval blockade on Venezuela to enforce collection of outstanding financial claims. This prompts the development of the Roosevelt Corollary to the Monroe Doctrine.

Births
 6 January – Helmut Poppendick, German physician (died 1994)
 17 January – Martin Harlinghausen, German air force general (died 1986)
 30 January – Nikolaus Pevsner, German-born British architectural historian (died 1983)
 1 February – Therese Brandl, German concentration camp guard and war criminal (d. 1948)
 5 February – Paul Nevermann, German politician (died 1979)
 7 March – Heinz Rühmann, German actor (died 1994)
 18 March – Siegfried Westphal, German general (died 1982)
 21 March – Gustav Fröhlich, German actor (died 1987)
 2 April – Jan Tschichold, German-born typographer (died 1974)
 2 August – Moshe Rudolf Bloch German-born Israeli scientist (died 1985)
 13 August – Felix Wankel, German engineer (died 1988)
 10 July – Kurt Alder, German chemist (died 1958)
 12 August – Franz Etzel, German politician (died 1970)
 22 August – Leni Riefenstahl, German film director, producer, screenwriter, editor, photographer, actress and dancer. (died 2003)
 5 September – Fritz-Dietlof von der Schulenburg, German government official and a member of the German Resistance in the 20 July Plot (died 1944)
 21 October – Kurt Scharf, German clergyman and bishop of the Evangelical Church in Berlin-Brandenburg (died 1990)
 1 November – Eugen Jochum, German conductor (died 1987)
 4 November – Otto Bayer, German chemist (died 1982)
 22 November – Moshe Unna, German-born Israeli politician (died 1989)
 21 December – Ulrich Wilhelm Graf Schwerin von Schwanenfeld, German landowner, officer, and resistance fighter against the Nazi régime (died 1944)

Deaths

 7 January – Wilhelm Hertz, writer (born 1835)
 March 11 – Friedrich Engelhorn, German industrialist and founder of BASF (born 1821)
 April 5 - Hans Ernst August Buchner, German bacteriologist (born 1850)
 April 19 
 Heinrich XXII, Prince Reuss (Reuss Elder Line) of Greiz (born 1846)
 Hans von Pechmann, German chemist (born 1850)
 19 June – Albert, King of Saxony, (born 1828)
 5 September – Rudolf Virchow, German doctor, anthropologist, pathologist, prehistorian, biologist, writer, editor, and politician (born 1821)
 26 September – Levi Strauss, German-born American businessman, founder of the first company to manufacture blue jeans. (born 1829)
 7 September – Franz Wüllner, German composer and conductor (born 1832)
 25 November – Ernst Schröder, mathematician mainly known for being a major figure in mathematical logic (born 1841)

References

 
Years of the 20th century in Germany
Germany
Germany